Rumen Nenov (29 December 1969 – 15 June 2017) was a Bulgarian footballer who played as a goalkeeper.

Honours
CSKA Sofia
A Group: 1991–92
Bulgarian Cup: 1992–93

References

1969 births
2017 deaths
Bulgarian footballers
Association football goalkeepers
FC Botev Vratsa players
PFC CSKA Sofia players
PFC Slavia Sofia players
FC Lokomotiv 1929 Sofia players
First Professional Football League (Bulgaria) players
People from Razlog
Sportspeople from Blagoevgrad Province
20th-century Bulgarian people
21st-century Bulgarian people